Marinići is a village in Viškovo municipality, Croatia.

References

Populated places in Primorje-Gorski Kotar County